Jean-Pierre Truqui (born 7 July 1956) is a French former professional footballer who played as a midfielder and defender. In his professional career, he played for Marseille, Angoulême, Saint-Dié, and Valenciennes.

References 

1956 births
Living people
Sportspeople from Cannes
French footballers
French football managers
Association football midfielders
Association football defenders
INF Vichy players
Olympique de Marseille players
Angoulême Charente FC players
SR Saint-Dié players
Valenciennes FC players
French Division 3 (1971–1993) players
Ligue 1 players
Ligue 2 players
Footballers from Provence-Alpes-Côte d'Azur